The West Loop–LaSalle Street Historic District is a historic district centered on LaSalle Street in the western Chicago Loop. The district was added to the National Register of Historic Places on June 1, 2013. A boundary increase on July 24, 2017, added two buildings at 330 S. Wells Street and 212 W. Van Buren Street to the district.

The district encompasses Chicago's financial center, which is anchored by the Chicago Board of Trade Building, and also includes several of its major banking institutions including the Federal Reserve bank and several government buildings. Development in the district began in 1873 and, with the exception of a lull during the Great Depression and World War II, has continued through the present day.

Most of the district's buildings are high-rises with at least ten stories, with the tallest being the 49-story One North LaSalle Building. Many of Chicago's prominent architectural firms designed buildings within the district, and the buildings feature styles such as Classical Revival, Chicago School, Art Deco, Romanesque Revival, and International. Significant buildings within the district include the Federal Reserve Bank of Chicago, Chicago City Hall, and several office buildings for large banks and insurance companies.

Buildings and structures

LaSalle Street

Wells Street

Clark Street

Dearborn Street

Wacker Drive

Randolph Street

Washington Street

Madison Street

Monroe Street

Adams Street

Jackson Boulevard

Van Buren Street

Works cited

References

National Register of Historic Places in Chicago
Historic districts on the National Register of Historic Places in Illinois
Neoclassical architecture in Illinois
Chicago school
Art Deco architecture in Illinois
Romanesque Revival architecture in Illinois
International style architecture in Illinois
Financial districts in the United States